Carl Henrik Lennart Holmberg (born 5 July 1963) is a Swedish curler.

Teams

Men's

Mixed

References

External links
 

Living people
1963 births
Swedish male curlers
Swedish curling champions
20th-century Swedish people